Alto Lee Adams Sr. (January 31, 1899 – February 20, 1988). Adams was a justice for the Florida Supreme Court in the U.S. state of Florida.  Alto Adams served on the Florida Supreme Court as a Justice from 1940 until 1951. From 1949 to 1951 Adams served as chief justice.

Born and reared in Walton County, Florida, near DeFuniak Springs, Adams graduated from the University of Florida College of Law in 1921. While at the University of Florida, he was member of Alpha Phi Epsilon and Florida Blue Key. He also was named a Designated Distinguished Alumnus in 1974.

After gaining admission to the bar, Adams "moved to Ft. Pierce to practice law". In 1936, he campaigned for the election of Fred P. Cone as Governor of Florida, "and was rewarded for his support by an appointment to the circuit bench in 1938 and to the supreme court in 1940". In 1940, the Florida Constitution was amended to add a seventh Justice to the Florida Supreme Court, the seat to which Governor Cone appointed Adams. Adams served on the court until 1951, when resigned to undertake an unsuccessful campaign for governor.

In 1967, Governor Claude R. Kirk appointed Adams as an interim justice to fill a vacancy created by the resignation of Stephen C. O'Connell. Kirk had initially attempted to appoint Wade L. Hopping, but Hopping was declared ineligible, not having been a member of the Florida Bar for the requisite ten-year period. Adams served until Hopping met the eligibility requirements in late 1968.

References

External links
Justice Adams info

1899 births
Justices of the Florida Supreme Court
1988 deaths
20th-century American judges
Chief Justices of the Florida Supreme Court
People from Walton County, Florida
Fredric G. Levin College of Law alumni